Claire Harris is a photographic and mixed-media artist from New Zealand. In 2016 she was part of the artists' collective Fantasing which held the Artist in Residence position at the Audio Foundation in Auckland, New Zealand.

Harris was raised in Gore and Christchurch in the South Island of New Zealand. She graduated from the University of Canterbury School of Fine Arts in 2005, majoring in photography, and completed a Post Graduate Diploma of Fine Arts at Massey University in 2009. Harris specialises in video performance art and photography.

Exhibitions 
 A Horse Walks Into a Bar, Cur. Mark Williams, Media Gallery, The Film Archive, Wellington, New Zealand, 2010
 Knowing You, Knowing Me: New Artists Show, Cur. Emma Bugden, ARTSPACE, Auckland, New Zealand, 2010
 Typical Girls: Comedic Feminist Video from Wellington, Cur. Bryce Galloway, Media Gallery, The Film Archive, Wellington, New Zealand, 2011
 Through The Keyhole, Enjoy Public Art Gallery, Wellington, New Zealand, 2013

Awards and recognition 
 Best distribution (for New Zealand Comics Creators), 2010 Black River Digital Eric Awards
 Celebrity Squares: Miley 2014, Parkin Drawing Prize finalist, 2015

References

Living people
Massey University alumni
Ilam School of Fine Arts alumni
New Zealand women photographers
New Zealand women artists
Year of birth missing (living people)
New Zealand artists